The Madrid Royal Conservatory is a music college in Madrid, Spain.

History
The Royal Conservatory of Music was founded on July 15, 1830, by royal decree, and was originally located in Mostenses Square, Madrid. In 1852 it was moved to the Royal Opera, where it remained until the building was condemned by royal order and classes ordered to halt in 1925. For the next sixty-five years, the school had no fixed home, operating in a variety of locations. Since 1990, the Conservatory has officially lived in a restored 18th-century building (previously San Carlos Royal Hospital) in front of Queen Sofia Museum.

Alumni
Famous alumni of the school include:

 Isaac Albéniz
 Francisco Tarrega
 Joaquín Achúcarro
 José María Alvira
 Pedro Albéniz
 Ataúlfo Argenta
 Emilio Arrieta
 Teresa Berganza
 Tomás Bretón
 Jorge Cardoso
 Pablo Casals
 Penélope Cruz
 Ruperto Chapí
 Miguel Ángel Coria
 José Cubiles
 Manuel de Falla
 Maria Galvany
 Antón García Abril
 Luis Antonio García Navarro
 Cristóbal Halffter
 Gareth Koch
 Ricardo Llorca
 Fernando Malvar-Ruiz
 Jaime Mendoza-Nava
 María José Montiel
 Manuel Ochoa
 Luis de Pablo
 Manuel Quiroga
 Miguel Roig-Francolí
 Amadeo Roldán
 Dulce María Serret
 Joaquín Turina
 Octavio Vazquez
 Marcos Vidal
 Marie Azpiroz Mellini

Professors

 Pedro Albéniz
 Emilio Arrieta
 Rafael Benedito Vives
 Francisco Calés Otero
 Francisco Calés Pina
 Conrado del Campo
 Ramón Carnicer y Batlle
 Pau Casals
 Teresa Catalán
 Arturo Dúo Vital
 Miguel Hilarión Eslava
 Óscar Esplá
 Manuel Fernández Alberdi
 Enrique Fernández Arbós
 Antonio Fernández Bordas
 Ismael Fernández de la Cuesta
 Manuel Fernández Grajal
 Tomás Fernández Grajal
 Gaspar Ángel Tortosa Urrea
 Carlos Gómez Amat
 Julio Gómez García
 Alberto Gómez (pianista)
 Ana Guijarro
 Jesús Guridi
 Enrique Iniesta
 José Inzenga
 Ildefonso Jimeno de Lerma
 José de Aranguren y de Añivarro
 Antonio López Almagro
 Juan Medina (compositor)
 Víctor Mirecki Larramat
 Jesús de Monasterio
 Laura Nieto Oliver
 Ángel Manuel Olmos
 Julia Parody
 Bartolomé Pérez Casas
 Juan Ruiz Casaux
 Vicente Spiteri
 Juan Tellería
 José Tragó
 Joaquín Turina
 Mariano Vázquez Gómez
 Dámaso Zabalza

External links
 Madrid Conservatory website

 
Educational institutions established in 1830
1830 establishments in Spain